Sandro Wieser (born 3 February 1993) is a Liechtensteiner professional footballer who plays as a midfielder for FC Vaduz.

Club career

Early career
Born in Vaduz, Wieser began his youth career with FC Triesen and moved onto FC Vaduz. In 2006, he continued his youth career with FC Basel playing in the U-16, U-18 and U-21 teams. He signed his first professional contract on his 18th birthday. He played his debut on 20 March 2011 in the 2–1 away win against Grasshopper Club Zürich. At the end of the 2010–11 Swiss Super League season Sandro Wieser won the Super League Championship title with FC Basel.

Because Wieser is born in 1993, he was eligible to play for the newly formed Basel Under-19 team in the 2011–12 NextGen series. He played in his first game against Tottenham Hotspur on 17 August 2011.

On 27 December, Basel announced that Wieser would transfer to German club TSG 1899 Hoffenheim in the January 2012 transfer window. Wieser however didn't manage to earn a spot in Hoffenheim's first squad, being capped in the Bundesliga only once in 18 months. As a result of this, he was put on loan, first in summer 2013 to Austrian side SV Ried and then in next summer to Swiss FC Aarau, each time the loan was terminated to a year.

Foul on Yapi Yapo
FC Zürich launched legal proceedings against Wieser after the 21-year-old committed a knee-high challenge on Gilles Yapi Yapo in a match on 9 November 2014, leaving the former Ivory Coast international's career in serious doubt. Yapi Yapo suffered torn anterior and cruciate ligaments, a torn meniscus, a torn kneecap tendon, serious cartilage damage and deep bruising to his thigh after the incident. Wieser was shown a straight red card for the tackle, and was later suspended for six matches by the Swiss league. With Yapi Yapo highly unlikely to ever play again, club president Ancillo Canepa launched legal proceedings against Wieser.

Reading
On 18 August 2016, Wieser signed a three-year contract with English Championship side Reading.

On 31 August 2017, transfer deadline day, Wieser joined K.S.V. Roeselare on a season-long loan deal.

On 1 June 2018, Wieser was released a year early from his Reading contract by mutual consent.

FC Vaduz return
On 12 June 2018, Wieser signed a three-year contract with FC Vaduz. On 22 July 2018 he scored his first goal for the club in Vaduz's first match of the 2018–19 Swiss Challenge League, a 3–1 victory over FC Chiasso.

International career
Wieser received his first call-up to the senior team in 2009, and made his debut against Iceland on 11 August 2010.

Career statistics

Club

International

Statistics accurate as of match played 11 September 2019

International goals
Scores and results list Liechtenstein's goal tally first.

Honours
Basel
 Swiss champion at U-16 level: 2007–08
 Swiss Cup winner at U-16 level: 2007–08 
 Swiss champion at U-18 level: 2009–10
 Swiss Super League champion: 2011

References

External links
 
 Profile at FC Basel 
 Profile at Swiss Football League Website 
 Profile at Liechtensteiner Fussballverband Website 

1993 births
Living people
People from Vaduz
Association football midfielders
Liechtenstein footballers
Liechtenstein international footballers
FC Basel players
TSG 1899 Hoffenheim players
TSG 1899 Hoffenheim II players
SV Ried players
FC Aarau players
FC Thun players
Reading F.C. players
FC Vaduz players
Swiss Super League players
Bundesliga players
Regionalliga players
Austrian Football Bundesliga players
Swiss Challenge League players
Liechtenstein expatriate footballers
Expatriate footballers in Switzerland
Expatriate footballers in Germany
Expatriate footballers in Austria
Expatriate footballers in England